Hanamizuki (ハナミズキ, Dogwood) is the fifth single by Yo Hitoto. It was released on February 2, 2004. It is a song promoting pacifism inspired by the September 11 attacks. 
It is one of the most popular songs on karaoke and also Yo Hitoto's most iconic song.

Track listing
All lyrics were written by Yo Hitoto and the arrangement was by Satoshi Takebe.
  'Hanamizuki' (ハナミズキ, Dogwood)
  'Nennensaisai' (年年歳歳, Year after Year)
  'Hanamizuki (instrumental)'

Chart

In Japan, the song was the second sung in Heisei Period. (from JOYSOUND)

Cover versions
 Eric Martin covered the song in English on his 2008 album Mr. Vocalist.

 Hayley Westenra covered the song in English and titled it "Dogwood Flower"

 Yui Aragaki covered the song for the Japanese film "Hanamizuki"
 Robbie Dupree covered the song in English on the various artists album "E35-II Let's Sing J-Pop in English"

Film

References

2004 songs